The discography of CNBLUE, a South Korean rock band, consists of 10 studio albums, 14 extended plays (EPs), 33 singles, three compilation albums, nine video albums, and 29 music videos released in its home country and Japan.

Formed in 2009, the quartet debuted as an indie band in Japan with its mini album Now or Never and debuted in 2010 with Bluetory in South Korea. In October 2011 they had their major debut in Japan with single "In My Head".

Albums

Studio albums

Compilation albums

Extended plays

Singles

As lead artist

Promotional singles

Other charted songs

See also
 CNBLUE videography

Notes

References

Discography
Discographies of South Korean artists
K-pop music group discographies
Rock music group discographies